Fuglsø (Danish for Birds Lake (Pronounced: fʊlsø)) is a minor town in Denmark placed in the national park of Mols Bjerge. It is mostly visited as a summer house place by people from Germany, Norway and Denmark. The municipality of Fuglsø is Syddjurs Municipality and it lies in the Central Denmark Region

Settlement 

Not many people live in Fuglsø, which is because it's such a summer vacation city, although someone also spent the winter holidays there. A few farms such as Sølballegaard lies there, but are now for sale. The Fuglsøcenteret (Fulgsø Center) is the only hotel in Fulgsø. The Fulgsøcenteret used to be a gym owned by DGI, but they sold it in October 2011, but the Fuglsøcenteret still have a lot of sport events.

Attractions 

Many people go to Ebeltoft by day, because of attractions such as Fregatten Jylland, Glasmuseet Ebeltoft and Ree Park – Ebeltoft Safari. Around Fuglsø lies Trehøje and Tinghulen, but the only attraction Fuglsø got to offer is the nature and the beach, Fuglsø Strand.

Villages in Denmark
Populated places in Central Denmark Region
Syddjurs Municipality